Jitendra Nath Das was an Indian politician belonging to the Communist Party of India (Marxist). He was elected to the Lok Sabha, lower house of the Parliament of India from Jalpaiguri in 1991 and 1996.

References

External links
  Official biographical sketch in Parliament of India website

1938 births
Communist Party of India (Marxist) politicians from West Bengal
People from Jalpaiguri district
India MPs 1991–1996
India MPs 1996–1997
Lok Sabha members from West Bengal
Living people